This is a complete List of National Historic Landmarks in Washington. The United States National Historic Landmark program is operated under the auspices of the National Park Service, and recognizes structures, districts, objects, and similar resources nationwide according to a list of criteria of national significance. The state of Washington is home to 24 of these landmarks, extensively highlighting the state's maritime heritage (with eight individual boats) and contributions to the national park movement (including three sites within Mount Rainier National Park, which is also listed), while recognizing a range of other aspects of its historic legacy.



Current NHLs in Washington

The table below lists the 24 Washington sites (including one that spans the Washington-Oregon state line) that are currently designated as National Historic Landmarks, along with descriptions and other details.

|}

Historic areas in the United States National Park System
National Historic Sites, National Historic Parks, National Memorials, and certain other areas listed in the National Park system are more highly protected than other historic sites, and are often not also named National Historic Landmarks.  There are five of these in Washington (six are listed, but San Juan National Historic Park is already listed here as "American and English Camps"), which the National Park Service lists together with the National Historic Landmarks in the state.

Former NHL in Washington

See also

Historic preservation
History of Washington
National Register of Historic Places
National Register of Historic Places listings in Washington

References

Sources

External links
National Historic Landmark Program at the National Park Service
Lists of National Historic Landmarks

Washington
 
Historic Landmarks
National Historic Landmarks
National Historic Landmarks